Vojtěch Bareš (born 1974) is a Czech slalom canoeist who competed in the 1990s and early 2000s.

He won two bronze medals in the K1 team event at the ICF Canoe Slalom World Championships, earning them in 1993 and 1999. He also won a silver medal in the K1 team event at the 1998 European Championships in Roudnice nad Labem.

World Cup individual podiums

References

Czech male canoeists
Living people
1974 births
Medalists at the ICF Canoe Slalom World Championships